This is a list of historical and living Bosniaks who are famous or notable.

Academics

A–M 

Adil Zulfikarpašić, politician and intellectual
Aida Hadžialić, Swedish youngest minister ever
Akif Šeremet, history and geography professor and communist activist
Asim Peco, linguist and academic 
Edina Lekovic, Director of Policy & Programming at the Muslim Public Affairs Council
Emir Vildić, academic musician
Enver Redžić, historian, cultural observer, publisher, professor
Faruk Čaklovica, Professor of Bromatology and Rector of the University of Sarajevo.
Ferid Muhić, Professor of Philosophy
Hasan Muratović, former rector of the University of Sarajevo
Kemal Gekić, professor of piano at the Florida International University
Rifat Rastoder, politician, writer and journalist
Mahmut Bajraktarević, mathematician
Metin Boşnak, scholar of American Studies and Comparative Literature
Muhamed Filipović, Bosnian historian and philosopher
Mustafa Ejubović, historian and Mufti of Mostar
Mustafa Imamović, Bosnian historian
Mina Aganagić, mathematical physicist

N–Z 

Nasiha Kapidžić-Hadžić, children's book author and poet
Nijaz Duraković, author, intellectual, professor and politician
Nijaz Ibrulj, philosopher and a professor at the University of Sarajevo's Department of Philosophy and Sociology
Endi E. Poskovic, Professor at the University of Michigan School of Art and Design and Associate Faculty at the University of Michigan Center for Russian, East European, and Eurasian Studies (CREES)
Seada Palavrić, judge of the Constitutional Court of Bosnia and Herzegovina
Senahid Halilović, linguist
Smail Balić, Austrian historian and culturologist of Bosniak origin
Šefik Bešlagić, cultural historian
Šemso Tucaković, writer, historian and faculty member in the Department of Political Sciences at the University of Sarajevo.
Šerbo Rastoder, historian
Zijad Delic, Bosnian-Canadian Imam, activist, teacher, scholar and public speaker

Artists

A–M 

 Adi Granov, comic book artist
 Endi E. Poskovic, Bosnian-American artist and printmaker.
 Kemal Curić, Bosnian automobile designer.
 Mersad Berber, painter

N–Z 

 Nela Hasanbegović, sculptor
 Nesim Tahirović, painter, sculptor
 Omer Halilhodžić, Bosnian automobile designer.
 Safet Zec, painter, graphic designer
 Selma Harrington, Bosnian-born architect and designer who currently lives in Dublin, Ireland.

Music

Composers
Alexander von Zemlinsky (1871–1942), Austrian composer and conductor who had a Bosniak maternal grandmother
Dino Zonić, composer and conductor
Ismet Alajbegović Šerbo (1925–1987), composer, songwriter and accordionist

Opera
Jasmin Bašić (born 1971
Aida Čorbadžić (born 1976)
Bahrija Nuri Hadžić (1904–1993)

Pop

Anabela Atijas (born 1975), father was a Bosniak
Adnan Babajić (born 1988)
Alma Čardžić (born 1968)
Amila Glamočak (born 1966)
Dalal Midhat-Talakić (born 1981)
Danijel Alibabić, Montenegrin singer with a Bosniak father
Deen (born 1982)
Denial Ahmetović (born 1995)
Dino Merlin (born 1962)
Donna Ares (1977–2017)
Dženy (born 1987)
Eldin Huseinbegović (born 1978)
Elvir Mekić (born 1981)
Emina Jahović (born 1982)
Fazla (born 1967)
Kemal Monteno (1948–2015)
Lepa Brena (born 1960)
Maya Sar (born 1981)
Marija Šerifović (born 1984), has Bosniak ancestry through her father
Mirza Šoljanin (born 1985)
Nino Pršeš
Peter Nalitch (born 1981), Russian singer whose grandfather was a Bosniak
Rialda (born 1992)
Sabahudin Kurt (1935–2018)
Seka Aleksić (born 1981), mother was a Bosniak
Selma Bajrami (born 1980), mother was a Bosniak
Selma Muhedinović (born 1972)
Senidah (born 1985), Slovenian singer whose parents were Bosniaks
Zuzi Zu (born 1978)

Rock

Alen Islamović (born 1957)
Branko Đurić (born 1962), mother was a Bosniak
Cem Adrian (born 1980), Turkish singer of Bosniak ancestry
Elvir Laković Laka (born 1969)
Hari Varešanović (born 1961)
Sead Lipovača (born 1955)
Seid Memić (born 1950)

Rap
Buba Corelli (born 1989)
Edo Maajka (born 1978)
Frenkie (born 1982)
Jala Brat (born 1986)

Sevdalinka

Beba Selimović (1936–2020)
Damir Imamović (born 1978)
Dina Bajraktarević (born 1953)
Emina Zečaj (1929–2020)
Hanka Paldum (born 1956)
Himzo Polovina (1927–1986), father was a Bosniak
Meho Puzić (1937–2007)
Mirsada Bajraktarević (1951–1976)
Rešad Bešlagić (1912–1945)
Safet Isović (1936–2007)
Silvana Armenulić (1938–1976)
Umihana Čuvidina (1794–1870)
Zaim Imamović (1920–1994)
Zehra Deović (1938–2015)
Zekerijah Đezić (1937–2002)

Folk

Al' Dino (born 1970), singer-songwriter and composer
Asim Brkan (born 1954)
Elvidin Krilić (born 1962)
Elvira Rahić (born 1975)
Enes Begović (born 1965)
Esad Plavi (born 1965)
Halid Bešlić (born 1953)
Halid Muslimović (born 1960)
Haris Džinović (born 1951)
Jasmin Muharemović (born 1965)
Kemal Malovčić (born 1946)
Osman Hadžić (born 1966)
Nihad Alibegović (born 1962)
Nino Rešić (1964–2007)
Sanela Sijerčić
Šaban Šaulić (1951–2019)
Šako Polumenta (born 1960)
Šemsa Suljaković (born 1951)
Šerif Konjević (born 1957)

Guitarist
Denis Azabagić (born 1972), classical guitarist

Lutenist
Edin Karamazov (born 1965)

Songwriters
Edo Mulahalilović (1964–2010)
Fahrudin Pecikoza (born 1962)
Faruk Buljubašić

Trumpeter
Izudin Čavrković (1941–2007)

Cinematography and theatre

A–M 

Ademir Kenović (born 1950), director and producer
Adnan Hasković (born 1984), actor
Ahmed Imamović (born 1971), director, producer and screenwriter
Ajla Hodžić (born 1980), actress
Amra Silajdžić (born 1984), actress and model
Bahrudin Čengić (1931–2007), film director and screenwriter
Benjamin Filipović (1962–2006), filmmaker
Damir Nikšić (born 1970), conceptual artist
Danis Tanović (born 1969), filmmaker
Elmir Jukić (born 1971), director
Emir Hadžihafizbegović (born 1961), actor
Enis Bešlagić (born 1975), actor
Fadil Hadžić (1922–2011), film director
Faruk Sokolović (born 1952), film director, producer, actor and screenwriter
Hajrudin Krvavac (1926–1992), film director
Haris Dubica, director
Haris Pašović (born 1961), theatre and film director
Husein Aličajić, filmmaker
Idda van Munster (born 1990), pin-up and model
Ismet Horo (born 1959), comedian
Izudin Bajrović (born 1963), actor
Jasmila Žbanić (born 1974), filmmaker
Jasmin Dizdar (born 1961), filmmaker
Kıvanç Tatlıtuğ (born 1983), actor and model (Tatlıtuğ's paternal grandmother was an ethnic Bosniak)
Mustafa Nadarević (1943–2020) actor
Rejhan Demirdžić (1927–1988), actor, TV writer and comedian

N–Z 

Reshad Strik (born 1981), Australian actor of Bosniak descent
Sabina Vajrača (born 1977), director, screenwriter, producer
Selma Alispahić (born 1970), actress
Senad Bašić (born 1962), actor
Sunny Suljic (born 2005), American actor of Bosniak descent
Sulejman Medenčević (born 1963), producer
Tahir Nikšić (born 1950), actor
Tarik Filipović (born 1972), actor
Zaim Muzaferija (1923–2003), actor
Zana Marjanović (born 1983), actress
Zijah Sokolović (born 1950), actor, writer, director
Zlatko Topčić (born 1955), screenwriter and playwright

Literature

A–M 

Abdulah Sidran, poet and screenwriter
Abdulvehab Ilhamija, 18th-century dervish and prose writer
Ahmed Muradbegović, writer, dramatist and novelist
Alija Isaković, essayist, publicist, playwright, and lexicographer of the Bosnian language
Bekim Sejranović, writer, translator
Bisera Alikadić, poet and author, best known for her work Larva and Krug
Derviš Sušić, writer best known for his first work I, Danilo
Dževad Karahasan, awarded writer and philosopher
Edhem Mulabdić, writer and co-founder of the political journal Behar
Enver Čolaković, best known for his 1944 novel The Legend of Ali-Pasha
Faruk Šehić, poet, novelist and short story writer
Hamid Dizdar, writer and poet but also older brother of Mak Dizdar
Hamza Humo, writer of short novels and editor of both Zabavnik and Gajret
Hasan Kikić, literate and poet who co-founded the journal Putokaz (Signpost)
Husein Dubravić, comedic writer, historian, teacher, and publisher
Ivan Franjo Jukić, writer and Franciscan friar 
Mak Dizdar, his works Stone Sleeper and The Blue River are important poetic achievements
Mehmed Kapetanović, writer and public official who founded the influential political journal Bošnjak ("Bosniak")
Mula Mustafa Bašeskija, 18th-century chronicler, diarist, poet, calligrapher and retired Janissary in the Ottoman Empire
Musa Ćazim Ćatić, poet of the Bosnian Renaissance at the turn of the 20th century
Mustafa Busuladžić, writer, scientist

N–Z 

Nasiha Kapidžić-Hadžić, children's author and poet
Nedžad Ibrišimović, writer and sculptor
Nihad Hasanović, writer and translator
Nura Bazdulj-Hubijar, novelist, poet and playwright
Osman Nuri Hadžić, intellectual and writer who co-launched the political journal Behar 
Safet Plakalo, playwright, journalist and theatre critic
Safvet-beg Bašagić, considered the father of Bosnian renaissance
Sait Orahovac, awarded author and folklorist
Semezdin Mehmedinović, writer and filmmaker but also a magazine editor
Skender Kulenović, novelist, dramatist and poet
Zaim Topčić, awarded writer
Zija Dizdarević, prose writer
Zlatko Topčić, awarded writer and screenwriter
Zuko Džumhur, writer, painter and caricaturist

Politicians

A–M 

Adem Huskić (born 1955), member of the House of Representatives in Bosnia and Herzegovina
Adil Zulfikarpašić (1921–2008), politician and intellectual
Adnan Terzić (born 1960), former Prime Minister
Ahmet Hadžipašić (1952–2008), former prime minister of the Federation of Bosnia and Herzegovina
Aida Hadžialić, Swedish youngest minister ever
Alija Behmen (1940–2018), Mayor of Sarajevo
Alija Izetbegović (1925–2003), served as president of Bosnia and Herzegovina
Arminka Helic, Special Adviser (SPAD) and Chief of Staff to the British Foreign Secretary William Hague.
Avdo Humo (1914–1983)
Bakir Izetbegović (born 1956), politician and son of Alija Izetbegović
Beriz Belkić (born 1946)
Bisera Turković (born 1954), Bosniak diplomat
Džafer Kulenović (1891–1956), Vice-President of the Independent State of Croatia
Džemal Bijedić (1917–1977), served as Prime Minister of former SFR Yugoslavia
Ed Husic (born 1970), Australian federal politician
Ervin Ibrahimović, politician
Ejup Ganić (born 1946), President of the Federation of Bosnia and Herzegovina from 1997–99, 2000–01
Fikret Abdić (born 1939), served as President of former Autonomous Province of Western Bosnia
Hamdija Lipovača (born 1976), Prime Minister of the Una-Sana Canton from 2010–14
Hamdija Pozderac (1924–1988), served as Vice President of former SFR Yugoslavia
Haris Silajdžić (born 1945), served as prime minister and president of Bosnia and Herzegovina
Hasan Brkić (1913–1965), Yugoslavian communist politician
Hasan Čengić (born 1957), former Deputy Prime Minister and Defense Minister of the Federation of Bosnia and Herzegovina
Ibran Mustafić (born 1960), politician and former soldier
Irfan Ljubijankić (1952–1995), Minister of Foreign Affairs 1993–95
Jasmin Imamović (born 1957), mayor of Tuzla since 2001
Mehmed Kapetanović (1839–1902), 2nd mayor of Sarajevo
Mehmed Spaho (1883–1939), leader of the Yugoslav Muslim Organization and the most popular Bosniak leader alongside Alija Izetbegović
Mustafa Fadilpašić (1830–1892), 1st Mayor of Sarajevo
Mustafa Mujezinović (1954–2019), former Prime Minister of the Federation of Bosnia and Herzegovina

N–Z 

Nahid Kulenović (1929–1969), member of the Croatian Liberation Movement
Nedžad Branković (born 1962), Bosnian politician
Nezir Škaljić (1844–1905), 3rd mayor of Sarajevo
Nurija Pozderac (1892–1943), politician and liberation leader during World War II, Patriarch of the Pozderac political family
Omer Behmen (1922–2009), co-founder of the Party of Democratic Action
Osman Karabegović (1911–1996), communist politician and Order of the People's Hero recipient
Osman Kulenović (1889–1947), politician and lawyer
Rafet Husović, former political leader of Bosniak party in Montenegro
Raif Dizdarević (born 1926), former Yugoslav president 1988–89
Rasim Ljajić (born 1964), Bosniak politician in Serbia
Rifat Rastoder (born 1950), deputy speaker of the Parliament of Montenegro and the vice-president of the Social Democratic Party of Montenegro
Sabina Ćudić, (born 1982) is a Bosnian politician who is vice-president of political party Naša stranka, Member of the House of Representatives of Parliament of the Federation of Bosnia and Herzegovina. 
Sanjin Halimović (born 1969), involved in Sanski Most politics
Safet Babic (born 1981), German politician of Bosniak descent
Selim Bešlagić (born 1942), mayor of Tuzla 1990–2001
Semiha Borovac (born 1955), former mayor of Sarajevo and Sarajevo's only female mayor
Sulejman Tihić (1951–2014), leader of the Party of Democratic Action and former president
Sulejman Ugljanin (born 1953), Bosniak politician in Serbia
Šahbaz Džihanović (born 1949), vice President of the Federation of Bosnia and Herzegovina
Zlatko Lagumdžija (born 1955), former Foreign Minister
Muamer Zukorlić (1970–2021), Bosniak politician and Islamic theologian, founder of the SPP political party and Grand Mufti of the Islamic Community of Sandžak from 1993-2016

Theologians

A–M 

Abdurahman Čokić (1888–1954), Mufti
Ali Džabić (1853–1918)
Antun Knežević (1834–1889)
Džemaludin Čaušević (1870–1938)
Ivan Franjo Jukić (1818–1857)
Mehmed Handžić(1906–1944), one of the authors of Resolution of Sarajevo Muslims'
Muhamed Šefket Kurt (1879–1963), Imam, theologian, Mufti of Banja Luka and Tuzla
Mustafa Cerić (born 1952), Bosniak cleric who served as the reisu-l-ulema of Bosnia and Herzegovina and currently president of the World Bosniak Congress.

N–Z 

Šefko Omerbašić (born 1945), Mufti and president of the Islamic Community in Croatia and Slovenia

Historical figures

A–M 

Alija Alijagić (1896–1922), early Communist and assassin
Ali-paša Rizvanbegović, Vizier of Herzegovina
Alija Sirotanović, famous miner
Damat İbrahim Pasha, Grand Vizier
Emina Sefić (1884–1967), subject of the poem Emina
Fata Omanović (1883–1967), historical figure
Fata Orlović (born 1942), woman in legal battle with Republika Srpska over church illegally built on her property
Hersekzade Ahmed Pasha, Ottoman statesman and navy's grand admiral
Hüseyin Pasha Boljanić, Ottoman statesman and government official
Husein-Kapetan Gradaščević, Bosniak rebel aristocrat
Mehmed-beg Kulenović, commander of the Bosniak forces in 1806
Muhamed Hadžijamaković, one of the leaders of the movement for independent Bosnia in 1878

N–Z 

Osman Gradaščević, Bosniak nobleman

Business People

Cem Uzan, businessman
Fahrudin Radončić, businessman and owner of Dnevni Avaz
Hakija Turajlić, businessman, economist and politician
Irfan Škiljan, creator of IrfanView
Kemal Kozarić, governor of the Central Bank of Bosnia and Herzegovina
Muhamed Sacirbey, Bosnian-American lawyer, businessman and diplomat
Sanela Diana Jenkins, entrepreneur and philanthropist
Selma Prodanović, entrepreneur and philanthropist
Mustafa Komadina, businessman and former mayor of Mostar

Sportspeople

Basketball
Damir Mršić, basketball player
Damir Mulaomerović, basketball player
Džanan Musa, basketball player
Emir Mutapčić, basketball player
Emir Preldžić, basketball player
Emir Sulejmanović, basketball player
Hidayet Turkoglu, basketball player
Jusuf Nurkić, basketball player
Mirsad Turkcan, basketball player
Mirza Delibašić, former basketball player and FIBA Hall of Fame
Mirza Teletović, basketball player
Nihad Đedović, basketball player
Razija Mujanović, basketball player
Sabahudin Bilalović, basketball player
Sead Šehović, basketball player 
Suad Šehović, basketball player

Football
Alen Bašić, football player
Adem Ljajić, football player
Adis Jasić, football player
Amar Dedić, football player
Anel Ahmedhodžić, fotball player
Asim Ferhatović, football player
Asmir Begović, football player
Darijo Srna, football player (Bosniak father, Croatian mother)
Edin Džeko, football player
Edin Višća, football player
Elvir Baljić, football player
Elvir Bolić, football player
Emir Spahić, football player
Enver Marić, football player 
Ermin Gadžo, football player
Haris Seferović, football player
Hasan Salihamidžić, football player
Mehmed Baždarević, football player
Meho Kodro, football player
Miralem Pjanić, football player
Mirsad Hibić, football player
Muhamed Bešić, football player
Muhamed Konjić, football player
Muhamed Mujić, football player
Mustafa Hasanagić, football player
Safet Sušić, football player
Sead Hakšabanović, football player
Sead Kolašinac, football player
Sejad Salihović, football player
Senad Lulić, football player
Sergej Barbarez, football player (Bosnian Serb father, Bosniak mother)
Vahid Halilhodžić, football player
Vedad Ibišević, football player
Zlatan Bajramović, football player
Zlatan Ibrahimović, football player (Bosniak father, Croatian mother)

Handball
Alen Muratović, handball player
Abas Arslanagić, handball playe
Benjamin Burić, handball player
Bilal Šuman, handball player
Edin Bašić, handball player
Enid Tahirović, handball player
Ermin Velić, handball player
Irfan Smajlagić, handball player
Majda Mehmedović, handball player
Mirsad Terzić, handball player
Mirza Džomba, handball player
Muhamed Memić, handball player 
Muhamed Toromanović, handball player
Sead Hasanefendić, handball player
Zlatko Saračević, handball player

Volleyball
Adis Lagumdžija, volleyball player
Asim Medić, volleyball player
Nizam Čančar, volleyball player
Sabahudin Delalić, volleyball player

Martial arts
Arnela Odžaković, karateka
Almedin Fetahović, boxer
Amer Hrustanović, wrestler
Amel Mekić, judoka
Damir Hadžović, mixed martial artist
Dževad Poturak, kickboxer
Enad Ličina, boxer
Felix Sturm, boxer
Hamid Guska, boxer
Larisa Cerić, judoka
Marco Huck, boxer
Memnun Hadžić, boxer
Mirsad Bektić, mixed martial artist
Nedžad Husić, taekwondo

Tennis
Amer Delić, tennis player
Damir Džumhur, tennis player
Ivan Ljubičić, tennis player
Mirza Bašić, tennis player

Other
Almir Velagić, weightlifter
Amel Tuka, track and field athlete
Dino Beganovic, Swedish-Bosnian racing driver
Hamza Alić, shot putter

Scientists, medicine and inventors

Asaf Duraković, physician and expert in nuclear medicine and depleted uranium
Asim Kurjak, physician, gynecologist
Asim Peco, linguist and professor of Philology at the University of Belgrade
Mahmut Bajraktarević, mathematician
Matrakçı Nasuh, Ottoman Polymath, inventor and swordsman
Rifat Hadžiselimović, geneticist

Military

A–M 

Abdulah Muhasilović, World War II army chaplain
Ahmet Sejdić, commander of the First Visegrad Brigade of the Army of Bosnia and Herzegovina
Arif Pašalić, Bosnian military officer who commanded the 4th Corps of the Army of Bosnia and Herzegovina
Atif Dudaković, former general in the Bosnian Army
Avdo Palić, Bosnian military officer during the Bosnian War
Elez Dervišević, youngest soldier to fight in World War I
Enver Hadžihasanović, General of the Army of the Republic of Bosnia and Herzegovina
Ferid Džanić, leader of the September 1943 Villefranche-de-Rouergue Mutiny within the SS Division Handschar.
Halim Malkoč, Bosnian Muslim Imam and SS Obersturmführer in the Waffen-SS division Handschar
Hersekzade Ahmed Pasha, Ottoman statesman and navy's grand admiral
Husejin Biščević, highest ranking Bosnian military officer in the 13th Waffen Mountain Division of the SS Handschar (1st Croatian)
Izet Nanić, Bosnian brigade commander
Mehmed Alagić, former general in the Army of the Republic of Bosnia and Herzegovina
Muhamed Hadžiefendić, Domobran senior officer, commander of a Bosniak militia and Bosnian autonomist in WWII
Mehmed-beg Kulenović, Ottoman soldier
Mušan Topalović, commander of the 10th Mountain Brigade in the Army of Bosnia and Herzegovina
Mustafa Hajrulahović Talijan, general of the Bosnian Army
Mustafa Polutak

N–Z 

Naser Orić, war-time military officer
Ramiz Delalić, commander of 9th Mountain Brigade in Sarajevo
Rasim Delić, former general and commander in the Bosnian Army
Sabiha Gökçen, first Turkish female combat pilot
Sefer Halilović, former general and commander in the Bosnian Army, politician
Sinan Bey Boljanić, sanjak-bey of Herzegovina and of Bosnia
Vahida Maglajlić, only Bosniak woman to receive the People's Hero of Yugoslavia medal for her part in the struggle against the Axis powers during World War II as a Yugoslav Partisan.
Zaim Imamović, commander of the Army of Bosnia and Herzegovina forces in Goražde during the Bosnian War

Militants
Sabina Selimovic and Samra Kesinovic, ISIS bride

Notable Criminals
Hazim Delić, Bosnian War criminal
Ismet Bajramović, Bosnian soldier and organised crime figure
Ramiz Delalić, one of several prominent underworld figures who helped defend Sarajevo
Mušan Topalović, Commander during the Bosnian war and a gangster
Jusuf Prazina, Sarajevan gangster and paramilitary warlord during the Bosnian War
Šefka Hodžić, convicted of the 1969 murder of her pregnant friend

Other

Šefik Bešlagić, (1908–1990), cultural historian
Dina Džanković (born 1986), Miss Serbia and Montenegro in 2005
Hasan Čemalović (born 1947), architect
Hasan Nuhanović (born 1968), survivor of the Srebrenica genocide
Himzo Selimović (born 1961), former head of the Ministry of Security
Inela Nogić (born 1976), won the 1993 Miss Sarajevo beauty pageant
Kemal Kurspahić (born 1946), Managing Editor of The Connection Newspapers
Omer Halilhodžić (born 1963), automotive designer
Suada Dilberović (1968–1992), first casualty of the Bosnian War
Selman Selmanagić (1905–1986), architect
Semir Osmanagić (born 1960), author, businessman and pseudoarchaeologist

See also 
 List of Bosnians
 List of Bosniak Sportspeople
 Bosnian people category

References

Bosniaks
Bosniaks